The 1st Asian Cross Country Championships took place 1991 in Fukuoka, Japan.

Medalists

Medal table

References
Results

1991
Asian Cross Country
Asian Cross Country
Asian Cross Country
Sport in Fukuoka
International athletics competitions hosted by Japan